Frazerview is a rural locality in the Scenic Rim Region, Queensland, Australia.

Geography 
Frazerview is located in the Fassifern Valley farming area to the west of Cunningham Highway.  Part of the south-eastern boundary of Frazerview is marked by Warrill Creek, a tributary of the Bremer River.

Mount Fraser rises in the west of Frazerview.  Its slopes have remained vegetated.  Kangaroo Mountain occupies central areas while the eastern parts feature irrigated farms close to Warrill Creek.

History 
Frazerview State School was opened on 25 November 1915.  Three days later the school was destroyed by fire.  It was re-opened one year later and continued to educate children until December 1975 when the school was closed due to low attendance rates. It was at 420 Frazerview Road.

The locality contained 14 households, in which 56.3% of the population were males and 43.7% of the population were females with a median age of 57, 19 years above the national average. The average weekly household income was $900, $538 below the national average.

References

Further reading 

 

Scenic Rim Region
Localities in Queensland